Palaeocopida is an order of ostracods in the subclass Podocopa. Most species in the suborder are extinct, and only the genera Manawa and Puncia in the family Punciidae are extant.

Taxonomy 
The following suborders are recognised in the order Palaeocopida:
 †Beyrichicopina
 †Binodicopina
 †Eridostracina
 Kirkbyocopina
 †Nodellocopina
 †Palaeocopina

References 

 Palaeocopida (Ostracoda) across the Permian–Triassic events: new data from southwestern Taurus (Turkey). Crasquin-Soleau S., Marcoux J., Angiolini L. and Nicora A., 2004, Journal of micropalaeontology, 23(1), pages 67–76, 

Crustacean orders
Podocopa